Robert Speck may refer to:

 Robert Speck (handball) (1909–1979), Romanian field handball player
 Robert Speck (politician) (1915–1972), first mayor of the Town of Mississauga, Ontario